Jordan Remacle (born 14 February 1987) is a Belgian footballer who currently plays for La Calamine in the Belgian Provincial Leagues. Remacle is a forward who was born in Verviers and made his debut in professional football, being part of the Racing Genk squad in the 2003–04 season. His younger brother Martin Remacle is also a footballer.

Honours
Lokeren
Belgian Cup: 2013–14

References

External links

1987 births
Living people
Association football forwards
Belgian footballers
Belgian Pro League players
Challenger Pro League players
Eredivisie players
Eerste Divisie players
K.R.C. Genk players
Standard Liège players
RKC Waalwijk players
Helmond Sport players
RBC Roosendaal players
Oud-Heverlee Leuven players
K.A.A. Gent players
S.K. Beveren players
K.S.C. Lokeren Oost-Vlaanderen players
Royal Antwerp F.C. players
R. Charleroi S.C. players
Belgian expatriate footballers
Expatriate footballers in the Netherlands
Belgian expatriate sportspeople in the Netherlands
Belgium youth international footballers
People from Verviers
Footballers from Liège Province